Saint Joavan (or Jaoua, Joévin, Jouva, Jaouen, Yaouen; died ) was an Irish priest and bishop in Brittany.

Monks of Ramsgate account

The monks of St Augustine's Abbey, Ramsgate wrote in their Book of Saints (1921),

Baring-Gould's account

Sabine Baring-Gould (1834–1924) in his Lives Of The Saints wrote under March 2,

Butler's account

The hagiographer Alban Butler (1710–1773) wrote in his Lives of the Fathers, Martyrs, and Other Principal Saints under March 2,

John O'Hanlon's account

John O'Hanlon (1821–1905) wrote on what had been recorded on Joava's life in his Lives of the Irish Saints (1875). 
In summary, Saint Ioava or Joava, Iovinus or Joevinus was Irish by birth. His mother was the sister of Saint Paul Aurelion.
He spent some time in Wales, where he studied under Saint Paul, then returned to Ireland.
Saint Paul left Wales for France and was consecrated first Bishop of Léon in Brittany.
When Ioava heard of this he left Ireland secretly (his parents wanted him to marry) and landed near Llandevenec, where Saint Winwaloe had founded a monastery.
He met the abbot Judulus, and went with him to his monastery of Llanaterenecan where he became a monk.
He learned quickly, and Judulus soon appointed him priest of the parish of Barspars.

At this time many of the people and nobility were pagan, and at one gathering where Joava and Judulus were present a noble named Toparsh of Le Fou attacked and killed Judulus, although Ioava escaped back to Barsparz.
He met his uncle Paul and went with him to Le Fou, where through preaching and miracles the population was converted to Christianity.
They founded a monastery at Le Fou and Joava was made the first abbot.
He later became the assistant of Saint Paul, who was now Bishop of Léon, and assumed all administrative functions.
After Paul retired, Joava became bishop, but only ruled for just over a year before dying in 554 or 555.

Notes

Sources

 
 
 
 

Medieval Irish saints on the Continent
555 deaths